The 2003 Las Vegas Desert Classic was the second major Professional Darts Corporation Las Vegas Desert Classic darts tournament. It was held in the MGM Grand Casino and Hotel, Las Vegas, Nevada in early July.

26 players competed in the tournament.  Peter Manley defeated John Part 16–12 in legs in the final and won $22,000.

Qualifiers

Seeds
  John Part
  Phil Taylor
  Roland Scholten
  Peter Manley
  Ronnie Baxter
  Colin Lloyd
  Alan Warriner
  Dennis Smith

Qualifiers
  Terry Jenkins
  Alex Roy
  Bob Anderson
  Dave Smith
  Wayne Mardle
  Paul Williams
  Denis Ovens
  Steve Beaton
  Robbie Widdows
  Les Hodkinson
  Dennis Priestley
  Andrew Davies
  Richie Burnett
  Jamie Harvey
  Tony Payne
  Roger Carter
  Ricky Villanueva
  Gerry Convery

Prize Fund

Results

Men's tournament

Preliminary round 30 June

Group Stages 1–3 July

Group A

Group B

Group C

Group D

Group E

Group F

Group G

Group H

Main Round 4–6 July

Women's tournament

References

2003
2003 in darts
MGM Grand Las Vegas